Edna Lee Paisano (January 1, 1948—September 3, 2014) was a Nez Perce and Laguna Pueblo demographer and statistician. She worked to improve the representation of Indigenous communities in the United States census. She advocated using statistics and computer programming to accurately represent the demography of the United States, arguing that without accurate counts of minority populations they would not receive proportional resources. Paisano put this into practice as the first Native American fulltime employee of the United States Census Bureau. She has been credited with substantially increasing the accuracy of the American Indian and Alaska Native census category between the 1980 census and the 1990 census.

Life and career
Paisano was born on the Nez Perce Reservation in Sweetwater, Idaho on January 1, 1948. Her mother was active in education efforts on the Reservation, and when Edna Paisano was a child, her mother was awarded the Leo Reano Memorial Award from the National Educational Association for that work. Paisano attended school in Lapwai, Idaho, and then spent two years at Boise College. After two years, she switched to the University of Washington. She graduated with a bachelor's degree in 1971. She then obtained a master's degree at the University of Washington in social work, and as part of her graduate work she studied statistics.

During her time at the University of Washington, she worked as part of a successful effort to found an American Indian cultural center in Fort Lawton. Fort Lawton had not been ceded to the United States government, and in 1976 Paisano was briefly imprisoned for actions as an activist attempting to secure the return of that land.

In 1980, Paisano was hired by the United States Census Bureau, becoming the first Native American to work there fulltime. She worked in particular on issues related to the American Indian and Alaska Native census category. There Paisano discovered that Native American communities were being dramatically under-counted in the United States census, which caused them to receive disproportionately few government resources and services. Upon arriving at the census bureau, she described realizing "how important it is for American Indians to know demography, computer programming and statistics: first, because there are very few American Indians in these fields; and second, because, the government is always trying to assess things".

In her work at the Census Bureau, Paisano identified a systematic undercount of regions where there were very large proportions of Native Americans. She attempted to rectify the imbalance using her training in statistics and computer programming, combined with a large public information campaign aimed at increasing the number of Native Americans who filled out the census. In particular, she developed a questionnaire to estimate the number of Native Americans who may not have been counted in the 1980 census, and she used her training in statistics to suggest improvements to how the US census attempted to count Native communities. Her efforts have been credited with being the catalyst for dramatically more accurate counts of Native Americans in the United States Census, resulting in a 38% increase in the number of people counted in the American Indian and Alaska Native category in the 1990 census compared to the 1980 census.

In addition to her work with the Racial Statistics Branch in the Population Division of the Census Bureau, Paisano also participated in the Interagency Task Force on American Indian Women. After 20 years at the Census Bureau, Paisano took a job with the Environmental Protection Agency. After a year, she became the chief statistician of the Indian Health Service within the Department of Health and Human Services.

Paisano retired from the federal government in 2011. She died on September 3, 2014, in Lewiston, Idaho.

Selected awards
Bronze Medal Award for Superior Federal Service, U.S. Department of Commerce, 1987
Department of Commerce Silver Medal, 1994
Distinguished Alumnus Award, University of Washington, 2003

Selected works
We the First Americans, US Census Bureau report, 1987
We the American-Pacific Islanders, US Census Bureau report, 1993
We the American-Asians, US Census Bureau report, 1993

References

1948 births
2014 deaths
Nez Perce people
Laguna Pueblo
Native American scientists
Native American social scientists
Women statisticians
United States Census Bureau people
Survey methodologists
American demographers
American statisticians
20th-century Native American women
20th-century Native Americans
21st-century Native American women
21st-century Native Americans
20th-century American women scientists
21st-century American women scientists
Scientists from Idaho
People from Nez Perce County, Idaho